L'Eau Frais Creek is an unincorporated community in Clark County, Dallas County, and Hot Spring County, in the U.S. state of Arkansas. A variant name is Low Freight Creek.

The name is derived from the French meaning "cold water".

References

Rivers of Clark County, Arkansas
Rivers of Dallas County, Arkansas
Rivers of Hot Spring County, Arkansas
Rivers of Arkansas